Manumission was a series of parties held in Ibiza, in the Balearic Islands of Spain. The events were created by Mike and Andy Manumission (or Mckay).

Name
The event founders describe Manumission as a lifestyle. The word "manumission" means "release from slavery" and in the party, people were "free to do whatever [they wanted] to do".

History
Manumission started in as a mixed gay event held at Club Equinox  in January 1994 in the Gay Village, Manchester, UK. It was forced to close due to gang warfare involving drug dealers before moving to the Ku Nightclub, Ibiza later that year.  Ku changed its name to Privilege Nightclub in 1995. The events continued until in 2007, and were resumed at Amnesia the same year, before finally ending in 2008.

References

Defunct nightclubs in the United Kingdom
Nightclubs in England
Nightclubs in Manchester
Culture of Ibiza
Entertainment events in Spain